Crimebroker is a 1993 Australian-Japanese television film, starring Jacqueline Bisset as a judge who moonlights as a "crime broker." It was also known as Corrupt Justice.

Plot Summary
Jacqueline Bisset plays a respectable Sydney housewife and magistrate who leads a double life selling expertly devised crimes.  In fact, she seems to have sassed it until she falls for Japanese criminologist Masaya Kato and is drawn into a partnership with him that could be dangerous for her health.

References

External links
 

1993 television films
1993 films
1993 crime drama films
1993 crime thriller films
1990s English-language films
1990s heist films
Australian television films
Films scored by Roger Mason (musician)
1990s Japanese films
1990s Australian films